Jürgen Melzer and Édouard Roger-Vasselin were the defending champions, but Roger-Vasselin chose not to participate and Melzer chose to compete in Vienna instead.

Jamie Murray and Bruno Soares won the title, defeating Andrey Golubev and Hugo Nys in the final, 6–3, 6–4.

Seeds

Draw

Draw

References
Main Draw

St. Petersburg Open - Doubles
2021 Doubles